Green Bay Botanical Garden (47 acres) is a nonprofit botanical garden located at  2600 Larsen Road, Green Bay, Wisconsin. It is open daily in the warmer months, or weekdays in the colder months; an admission fee is charged.

The gardens opened in 1996 on a site that was previously Larsen Orchard. As of 2017, the gardens include:

 Donald J. Schneider Family Grand Garden - with an overlook arbor opening to the Billie Kress Amphitheater with a grand stage and grassy seating for over 1,500 people, a classroom with bathrooms, a catering kitchen to the west, and the Matthew Schmidt Garden featuring the Wangerin Pavilion to the east
Agnes Schneider Terrace -  perennial flowers and ornamental grasses.
 Four Seasons Garden - a garden with winter interest, featuring magnolias, crabapples, lilacs, and perennials.
 Gertrude B. Nielsen Children’s Garden - children's garden, with a tree house, slide, maze, and sundial.
 Kaftan Lusthaus - a summerhouse of Scandinavian design.
 Mabel Thome Fountain & Garden - a fountain ringed with crabapples and annuals.
 Marguerite Kress Oval - a rose garden of contemporary design.
 John and Janet Van Den Wymelenberg Color and Foliage Garden - trees, shrubs, grasses, perennials, and vines with varied foliage (yellow, maroon, chartreuse, gray, and green).
 Larsen Orchard Remnant - apple trees, with an underplanting of spring-flowering bulbs.
 Mary Hendrickson Johnson Wisconsin Woodland Garden - an informal garden of native trees, shrubs and wild flowers surrounding a lawn for social gatherings.
 Schierl Wellhouse and Garden - The garden's well, and a garden of annuals and herbs.
 Stumpf Belvedere - a gazebo in early Greek style.
 Upper Rose Garden - a rose garden of hardy shrubs and hybrid tea roses.
 Vanderperren English Cottage Garden - a Wisconsin interpretation of an English cottage garden.

During the winter months, the garden hosts the WPS Garden of Lights, a display of over 200,000 holiday lights.

See also 
 List of botanical gardens and arboretums in Wisconsin

References

External links
 Green Bay Botanical Garden website

Botanical gardens in Wisconsin
Culture of Green Bay, Wisconsin
Protected areas of Brown County, Wisconsin
Woodland gardens